The Child Abuse Prevention and Treatment Act (Public Law 93–247) of 1988 provides financial assistance for demonstration programs for the prevention, identification, and treatment of child abuse and neglect and to establish a National Center on Child Abuse. Additionally, it identifies the federal role in supporting research, evaluation, technical assistance, and data collection activities; establishes the Office on Child Abuse and Neglect; and mandates the National Clearinghouse on Child Abuse and Neglect Information. It also sets forth a minimum definition of child abuse and neglect.

The key federal legislation addressing child abuse and neglect is the Child Abuse Prevention and Treatment Act (CAPTA), originally enacted in 1974 (Public Law 93-247). It was amended several times and was most recently amended and reauthorized by the Comprehensive Addiction and Recovery Act of 2016.

Effectiveness and state non-compliance

The law contains a long list of reporting and process requirements for states to be eligible. Though none have been declared non-compliant by the United States Children's Bureau, an investigation by The Boston Globe and ProPublica published in 2019 found that the 50 states, the District of Columbia, and Puerto Rico were all out of compliance with the requirements to varying degrees. The report found that underfunding of child welfare agencies and substandard procedures in some states caused failures to prevent avoidable child injuries and deaths.

In 2018, Congress provided $85 million to states under the law, an amount that anti-abuse advocates criticize as too low, and which some states found too little to justify rigorous compliance, which would bring its own costs.

Legislative history
The law was completely rewritten in the Child Abuse Prevention, Adoption and Family Services Act of 1988 (Public Law 100-294). It was further amended by the Child Abuse Prevention Challenge Grants Reauthorization Act of 1989 (P.L. 101-126 and the Drug Free School Amendments of 1989 (Public Law 101-226).

The Community-Based Child Abuse and Neglect Prevention Grants was a program that was originally authorized by Sections 402 to 409 of the Continuing Appropriations Act for Fiscal Year 1985 (Public Law 98-473). The Child Abuse Prevention Challenge Grants Reauthorization Act of 1989 (Public Law 101-126) transferred the program to the Child Abuse Prevention and Treatment Act, as amended.

A new Title III, Certain Preventive Services Regarding Children of Homeless Families or Families at Risk of Homelessness, was added to the Child Abuse and Neglect and Treatment Act by the Stewart B. McKinney Homeless Assistance Act Amendments of 1990 (Public Law 101-645).

The Child Abuse Prevention and Treatment Act was amended and reauthorized by the Child Abuse, Domestic Violence Adoption and Family Services Act of 1992 (Public Law 102-295), and amended by the Juvenile Justice and Delinquency Prevention Act Amendments of 1992 (Public Law 102-586).

The Act was amended by the Older American Act Technical Amendments of 1993 (Public Law 103–171, 12/2/93) and the Human Services Amendments of 1994 (Public Law 103–252, 5/19/94).
 
CAPTA was further amended by the Child Abuse Prevention and Treatment Act Amendments of 1996 (P.L. 104–235, 10/3/96), which amended Title I, replaced the Title II Community-Based Family Resource Centers program with a new Community-Based Family Resource and Support Program, and repealed Title III.

CAPTA was most recently amended by the Keeping Children and Families Safe Act of 2003 (P.L. 108–36, 6/25/03), which amended Title I and replaced Title II, Community-Based Family Resource and Support Program with Community-Based Grants for the Prevention of Child Abuse and Neglect. CAPTA was reauthorized in 2010, as the Child Abuse Prevention and Treatment Act of 2011 (Public Law 111-320).

See also
 Karly's Law
 Landeros v. Flood
 Subpoena duces tecum
 Subpoena ad testificandum
 UN Convention on the Rights of the Child

References

U.S. D.H.H.S. Administration for Children and Families
Library of Congress - Public law 93-247
American Family Rights Association - Critics of CPS abuses.
Fighting Child Protective Services False Accusations
Foster Care Abuse Network

Notes

External links
 Child Abuse Prevention and Treatment Act (PDF/details) as amended in the GPO Statute Compilations collection
 Definitions of Child Abuse and Neglect in Federal Law  U.S. Department of Health and Human Services
 U.S. Code Title 42, Chapter 67 - Full text. 

1974 in law
Family law
United States federal child welfare legislation
United States federal criminal legislation